Danestown Fort  is a ringfort (rath) and National Monument located in County Meath, Ireland.

Location

Description

References

Archaeological sites in County Meath
National Monuments in County Meath